Zunqul, also spelled Zūnqal, Zounqul or Zornaqal, is a village located  northwest of Manbij in northern Syria. In the 2004 census, it had a population of 1,966.

References

Aleppo